Power FM (ACMA call sign: 5EZY) is a contemporary hit radio-formatted commercial radio station based in Murray Bridge, South Australia. Broadcasting on 98.7FM, the station has repeaters at Victor Harbor on 99.7FM and in the Adelaide Hills on 100.3FM.

In November 2021, Power FM, along with other stations owned by Grant Broadcasters, were acquired by the Australian Radio Network. This deal will allow Grant's stations, including Power FM, to access ARN's iHeartRadio platform in regional areas. The deal was finalized on January 4, 2022. It is expected the Power FM SA stations will integrate with ARN's KIIS Network, but will retain their current name according to the press release from ARN.

Key Contacts
 Dave Shearer, General Manager
 Adam Connelly, Content Director

References

External links
 Website

Radio stations in South Australia
Contemporary hit radio stations in Australia
Australian Radio Network